Tick is a time-tracking software operated by Higher Pixels (formerly The Molehill), headquartered in Jacksonville, Florida. It offers online time tracking and reporting services through its website, mobile applications, and desktop software. Tick tracks time based on clients, projects, and tasks through a timer or manual entry.

Features
Tick provides time tracking, management, and reporting services. API control is enabled for designers.

Tick features include:
 Manual time entry
 Timers
 Instant budget feedback in the timecard
 View and export reports
 Desktop App for Windows and Mac
 Apple Watch App
 Mac Widget
 Mac App
 Chrome Extension
 Native iPhone application and Android/Google application
 Integrates with Basecamp, Asana, and Trello.
 SSL encryption ensures outside sources are kept out
 Account administrators have full control over permissions and access levels
 Zapier Support
 Seamless invoicing options through QuickBooks or FreshBooks

Early SaaS & Ruby Adoption

Tick was one of the first software as a service applications to be built on the Ruby on Rails framework.

Company 

The software company, The Molehill, began in 2006 as a lifestyle business company. Molehill created the online business tool Tick to help companies hit their budgets by tracking time with the idea that employees help them to hit their budgets.

See also
Comparison of time tracking software
Project management software

References

External links
 

Time-tracking software
2006 software
Proprietary software